{{Speciesbox
| image = 
| status = CR
| status_system = IUCN3.1
| status_ref = 
| taxon = Cairnsichthys bitaeniatus
| authority = Allen, Hammer & Raadik, 2018<ref name = CofF>{{Cof record|spid=14184|title=Cairnsichthys bitaeniatus|access-date=6 July 2019}}</ref>
}}

The Daintree rainbowfish (Cairnsichthys bitaeniatus) is a species of rainbowfish endemic to Australia. This species is endemic to the wet tropics of north eastern Queensland where it has been recorded from the Cooper Creek and nearby Hutchinson Creek systems of the Daintree region of north-eastern Queensland. This species occurs in small clear, shady rainforest streams which flow over a substrate consisting of rock, sand, gravel and log debris. Within these streams the fishes swim near the surface to midwater depths and are frequently found in the deeper pools of these streams where there is a faster current. They will form mixed schools with blue-eyes and other rainbowfishes.

References

Further reading
 Hammer, Michael P. ; Gerald R. Allen; Keith C. Martin; Mark Adams; Brendan C. Ebner; Tarmo A. Raadik; and Peter J. Unmack (2018). Revision of the Australian Wet Tropics Endemic Rainbowfish Genus Cairnsichthys'' (Atheriniformes: Melanotaeniidae), with Description of A New Species. Zootaxa. 4413(2); 271–294. 

Daintree rainbowfish
Vulnerable fauna of Australia
Taxa named by Gerald R. Allen
Taxa named by Michael P. Hammer
Taxa named by Tarmo Ain Raadik
Daintree rainbowfish